Tiffany Valentine (also known as "The Bride of Chucky") is a murderous doll and the secondary antagonist in the Child's Play horror film series. She is portrayed by Jennifer Tilly in both live-action and voice over in Bride of Chucky, Seed of Chucky, Curse of Chucky, Cult of Chucky, and Chucky.

As a human, Tiffany has platinum blonde hair, a gothic fashion style, and a chest tattoo of a bleeding heart with 'Charles' written above it. After becoming a doll, Tiffany gives herself a makeover so as to better resemble her human self. Her physical appearance as a human and as a doll change throughout the franchise. Tiffany, like her love interest, Chucky, wishes to transfer her soul into the female human protagonist in both 'Bride Of Chucky' and 'Seed Of Chucky', succeeding in the latter; she manages to switch bodies with a fictionalised version of Jennifer Tilly.

Personality
Despite being a serial killer, Tiffany is sweet, creative, inventive, and a Great mom. She does possess a genuinely kind and compassionate side and is remorseful at some points, unlike Chucky.  It is shown in 'Bride of Chucky' that she loves deeply, believing "love will set her free". She is easily disappointed, violent, psychotic and unforgiving when angered. She attempts to reform in 'Seed of Chucky', to "break her addiction" to killing. However, Tiffany's urge to maim is strong, and she continues to murder especially if it means helping Chucky.

Appearances

Bride of Chucky (1998)

Tiffany bribes and murders a police officer in order to steal Chucky's remains from an evidence vault. After stitching and stapling the parts together, she re-enacts the voodoo ritual which put his soul inside the doll. When an argument reveals that Chucky had no intention of marrying her, an outraged and hurt Tiffany confines him in a playpen and taunts him with a Wedding Belle doll. Chucky breaks out of the pen and electrocutes Tiffany in her bath, killing her. Afterwards he completes another voodoo chant that transfers Tiffany's soul into the Belle doll. Stuck in the same circumstances, they need the Heart of Damballa (a voodoo amulet) buried with Chucky's human remains in Hackensack, New Jersey; Tiffany bribes a neighbor (Jesse) into transporting the "dolls" for $1000 over the phone.

Several people are killed in various ways during the road trip. Tiffany's particularly creative murder of a con-artist couple in a bridal suite moves Chucky enough to proclaim his love and propose to Tiffany; she accepts and they have sex. Jesse and his newly-wed wife Jade become wanted for the murders as all evidence links back to them; Chucky and Tiffany reveal they are alive and take the couple hostage. At one point they steal a Campervan. The hostages instigate a domestic fight between Chucky and Tiffany; Jade kicks her into the oven and Jesse throws Chucky out the window which ends with their stolen Campervan crashing.  Just as Jesse is about to kill Tiffany, he notices Chucky holding Jade at gunpoint, forcing her to take him to the graveyard where his body is buried. Jesse follows him and attempts to trade Tiffany for Jade. Chucky accepts but quickly recaptures the couple and prepares to transfer Tiffany's soul into Jade. However, moved by Jade and Jesse's love, Tiffany stabs Chucky and they fight. Tiffany is stabbed in the heart by Chucky and avenged by Jade who shoots Chucky to death. As she lies dying, Tiffany gives birth to a bloody baby doll that attacks the crime investigator.

Seed of Chucky (2004)

Chucky and Tiffany are accidentally brought back to life by their child when he reads the inscription on the Heart of Damballa out loud. When they see he has no genitals, Tiffany sees it as proof the child is a girl and names it Glenda (feminizing the name, Glen, which Chucky had given to him previously). Now going by "Tiffany Ray", she hopes to transfer her soul into the body of a fictionalised version of Jennifer Tilly, and Chucky plans to transfer his soul into Redman. They also plan to impregnate Jennifer and put Glen/Glenda's soul in the baby's body. Their plan is successful, as Jennifer swiftly gives birth to two babies, a boy and a girl. This works out perfectly as Glen/Glenda has a split personality: a sweet and caring boy, and a homicidal girl. Just as they are about to complete the ritual, the police show up, prompting Chucky to confess his desire to remain a doll after considering the cons of being human. Disturbed by this, Tiffany decides to leave Chucky and take Glen/Glenda with her, as she still wishes to be human.

Tiffany and Glen/Glenda go to Jennifer's hospital. Chucky follows them and hits her in the head with an axe for leaving him, thus killing her. Five years later, Jennifer is happily raising the twins-Glen and Glenda in human bodies-on her own. On the twins' birthday, one of the maids tries to quit her job because she is afraid of the "troubled child" Glenda. Tiffany tells her she can go, but then beats her to death with her dormant doll body. She laughs and her eyes glow green, revealing that Tiffany's soul transfer was a success. In the extended version, she hides the maids body and tells Glenda to keep a secret.

Curse of Chucky (2013)

Six years after the events of Seed of Chucky, Tiffany's soul still possesses actress Jennifer Tilly's body. She does not appear on-screen until it is revealed that she was the one responsible for mailing Chucky out to Nica's home, facilitating his murder spree on the family he blames for his human death. She pays a police officer to get Chucky from evidence after Nica's trial and once he is in his car she jumps up from the back and slits his throat with a nail file. The status of their twins is never stated. Six months later, Tiffany mails Chucky to the home of Nica's niece, Alice, and he suffocates her paternal grandmother. Chucky attempts to transfer his soul into Alice and it is shown that the grandmother is still alive. Alice's fate is clearly unknown.

Cult of Chucky (2017)

Four years after Nica Pierce was falsely imprisoned, Tiffany visits her in a mental institution after she was framed by Chucky for the murders of her family which Tiffany helped orchestrate. She is revealed to be the legal guardian of Nica's niece Alice and came to tell Nica that Alice had died, supposedly of a "broken heart". She leaves Chucky as a gift for Nica, saying that it was a gift from Alice. She later calls Andy Barclay and delivers a taunting message about Chucky's growing "Cult".

Tiffany later kills a security guard outside the Asylum, slitting his throat with a nail file. At the end of the film, Tiffany is reunited with Chucky (now possessing the body of Nica) and the two reaffirm their relationship with a kiss. Tiffany expresses some remorse at Alice's apparent death and says it was nice having her around. Chucky/Nica replies by saying "fuck that kid" and then they both begin laughing maniacally, along with the Tiffany doll sitting in the back of the car, which is revealed to hold part of Tiffany's soul before they drive off into the night.

Chucky (TV series)

Season One
After leaving the Harrogate mental institution, Tiffany and Nica/Chucky drive back to Hackensack and stay in the local hotel. They have kidnapped two men, having already killed one of them and forcing the other man to watch them make out while he is bound and gagged. Laughing, Tiffany comments how they're putting on a nice show for him, but all he does is moan and complain. She gets up off the bed and asks the man what he wants, before mentioning that she herself is hungry and wants a snack, preferably Swedish meatballs. This angers Chucky, and the two get into an argument about how much Tiffany likes to eat. She storms out of the room, and later returns to find Chucky knocked down on the ground, unaware that moments before Nica briefly regained control of her body.

Sometime after, Tiffany is struggling to pack one of the men's bodies into a large suitcase. They have a brief fight about cutting the body into smaller pieces, so Tiffany uses a cleaver to cut one of the man's hands off. The resulting blood splatters on Chucky's face, causing Nica to regain control again. Later on, the two women play poker while Nica tries to keep up the façade that she is Chucky. Suspicious of "Chucky", Tiffany attempts to have him recall the details of their honeymoon at Niagara Falls. After Nica gives a generic answer to try to bluff her, Tiffany reveals that she knows Nica has regained control of her body. And to prove her theory, she stabbed Nica in the thigh 10 minutes ago which she has still not felt or noticed. Scared, Nica asks what she plans on doing with her. Tiffany then divulges that she has developed feelings for Nica over the years, and prefers spending time with her over Chucky. As an added surprise, she tells Nica that she bought the two of them a house in Hackensack, which in reality is Charles Lee Ray's childhood home. She comments that her only problem is figuring out how to keep Nica in control instead of "that rat Chucky", and then knocks Nica unconscious with a pan to the head.

Stuffing Nica in the trunk of her Pontiac, Tiffany drives to her newly purchased home to meet with realtor Gladys. Under the guise of Jennifer Tilly, she tells the realtor she and her fiancé will be moving in immediately and that it was her fiancé's childhood home. Before driving away, Gladys gives Tiffany a package that she had already received in the mail. She then gets Nica out of the trunk and takes her into the house, keeping her bound and gagged before leaving her alone inside.

With Jake no longer willing to help Chucky, he and Tiffany set their sights on his cousin, Junior. While at the funeral for Junior's mother, Tiffany arrives uninvited and approaches his father Logan. Kissing him in front of everyone, she quickly turns around and leaves without saying another word. Later that night, Tiffany drives to the Wheeler house, and honks her horn for Junior to come out. Giving him some Swedish meatballs, she says that it is a gift and claims that their Logan's favourite. She then asks if Jake is home, but Junior changes the subject and questions what she was doing with Logan at the funeral. She acts surprised that Logan never told him about them, and tells him not to tell anyone that she was there, before quickly leaving in her car.

She arrives back at Charles' childhood home and finds Nica lying on the ground, unaware that Chucky is in control. While Tiffany prepares to drug Nica, Chucky takes the opportunity to sweep her leg and knock her down. Holding a knife over her head, Chucky prepares to stab her, but stops when she reminds him that he needs her or their plan won't work. He ignores her and again goes to stab her, but halts when Junior and his Chucky doll enter the house, reminding Nica/Chucky that they do in fact need Tiffany. She excitedly picks up the Chucky doll, happy to finally be reunited with him, and they all go downstairs where an army of 72 possessed Good Guy dolls are waiting for them. The dolls are placed into Good Guy boxes and packed into a truck, and Tiffany leaves the home to pay the driver to drop the dolls off at the theatre tomorrow. Returning inside, she finds Chucky and Nica/Chucky are engaged in a conversation. She tries to get the doll's attention, but when she is ignored, she angrily remarks that he is the most self-involved man she's ever met, and a real man would know how to treat a lady. When Nica/Chucky makes a snide comment back, Tiffany slaps him so hard that he falls to the ground, causing Nica to regain control. The Chucky doll apologizes to her, and as he mentions that "getting over himself" takes real sacrifice, he demands that Tiffany kill Nica. Distraught, she cannot overcome her feelings for Nica and cannot bring herself to kill her. When Chucky commands Junior to kill Nica, Tiffany finally snaps and proceeds to decapitate the doll with her nail file. Junior attempts to help Chucky, but Tiffany reminds him that he needs her help to get out of Hackensack after the police find his father's corpse. Picking up the head, she tells Chucky that she is done with him for good before dropping him on the ground. She drugs Nica and has Junior tie her arms together, while she sets up a bomb to leave for Andy Barclay. With the bomb in place at the front door, she puts Nica in the backseat of her car and hops into the front with Junior before they drive away.

The next day, Tiffany poses as celebrity guest Jennifer Tilly at a special movie screening benefitting children's hospitals, held by Mayor Cross. The mayor announces that as part of the benefit, 72 children's hospitals across the country will be receiving a priceless gift from Jennifer's personal collection of vintage Good Guy dolls, which will ship immediately after the movie screening. The mayor's daughter Caroline wants the Chucky doll Tiffany is holding, so she allows Caroline to take it into the movie theatre with her. After the movie is finished that evening, Tiffany meets with the truck driver to ensure the dolls are delivered to the airport before the plane leaves at midnight. She walks back to her car but finds that it doesn't start, and she watches helplessly as Andy Barclay drives the truck away with the dolls inside. However, as Andy is on the road, the Tiffany doll breaks through the glass and holds him at gunpoint, demanding he keep driving.

Meanwhile, Tiffany returns to a secret location where she is keeping Nica, who is finally waking up from being drugged. She tells Nica that she really likes her, but she couldn't run the risk that Chucky would regain control. Therefore, she amputated Nica's arms and legs to prevent her from fighting back.

Season Two

A year later, Tiffany still has Nica held captive, but unbeknown to her, Nica has been plotting with Chucky and her children, Glen and Glenda, to escape. Waking up one morning to find the head of  the Tiffany doll in her bed, Tiffany cuts her hand open to summon Chucky, who tells her that it is a warning he is coming and intends to kill her for betraying him.

An officer, who is searching for Nica, eventually shows up and states Nica has been spotted at the house and Tiffany kills him, by slitting his throat, to prevent him from taking Nica. Before being able to clean up the blood, Glen and Glenda arrive at the house for their birthday. They try to confront their mother about Nica, to which Tiffany acts like she doesn't know what they are talking about. Soon after it is revealed that Glen and Glenda had invited Gina Gershon, Joe Pantoliano, Sutton Stracke and Jennifer Tilly's real life sister, Meg Tilly (who they all believe her to be Jennifer Tilly) for a surprise party. When the hired butler named Jeeves ends up dead and Nica goes missing, Tiffany pretends she's hosting a murder mystery party and begins searching for Nica and questioning her guest about who killed Jeeves. It is eventually revealed that Glen and Glenda had discovered Nica three months prior and Glen was going to help Nica escape, while Nica/Chucky had convinced Glenda to help him kill Tiffany. This fails however and Nica regains control and leaves with Glenda and Kyle. Glen stays behind with their mother, with Glenda urging them to ask their mother, who they believe is Jennifer Tilly, who Tiffany Valentine is.

After this, Tiffany is distraught with grief at the loss of Nica and Glen confronts Tiffany about Nica's captivity, but Tiffany refuses to divulge any information unless Glen reveals Nica's whereabouts. When a suspicious Meg decides to stay at Tiffany's house, a captive Jennifer - trapped inside a Tiffany doll - feeds Tiffany false information, and Meg and Glen walk in on the two arguing. When Jennifer begs Meg for help, Tiffany murders Meg and reveals her true identity to Glen, bequeathing them the original Glen/Glenda doll. Tiffany and Glen burn down the house and leave with the doll and a tied-up Jennifer to find Glenda.

On the way to get Glenda and Nica, they stop at a truck stop to get food where Tiffany learns Jennifer Tilly is wanted for murder and panics when she starts getting recognized by the cashier and a customer. Rushing back to her car where Glen and Jennifer are waiting she begins to device a plan to switch bodies with Jennifer Tilly as she can only transfer her soul into a Wedding Belle doll due to the rules of Damballa where one’s soul can only be transferred into a similar host. Trying to take off the car fails to start and while being repaired Jennifer Tilly escapes only to be killed by an oncoming truck, making Tiffany incapable of transferring her soul. Her and Glen then head off to the school where Lexy, Devon and Jack are and once there, Nica tries to murder Tiffany for her captivity and removal of her arms and legs only for Glen to jump in the way of the bullet, accidentally being hit instead. Tiffany and Glenda together lift Glen up and take off to get Glen help.

While Glen is in the hospital, Tiffany goes into hiding when Glenda calls her to update her on Glen’s condition. They both decide to sneak Tiffany into the hospital to perform the Damballa chant to put Glen and Glenda’s souls back into their original doll. Tiffany disguises herself as a doctor to enter into Glen’s room but before she has a chance to do anything the officer who was guarding the door walks in, recognizes Tiffany as Jennifer Tilly and is about to arrest her but Glenda smashes a flower vase on his head knocking him out then uses defibrillator paddles to electrocute him as the water he is drenched in causes his head to burst into flames. Tiffany finally completes the ritual, leaving Glen and Glenda's human bodies devoid of their souls as they are combined into the doll. They are hidden back into the luggage, allowing Tiffany to smuggle them out. Returning to a hotel room, Tiffany gives them a makeover as they decide to go by a new name, "GG". With their new freedom, they announce to Tiffany their plans to travel to England to explore their roots. GG says their goodbyes to their mother, and finally heads off on their own.

After seeing GG off, Tiffany heads to the Cross residence due to discovering that Michelle Cross has a Wedding Belle doll, the exact one she needs to transfer her soul and escape being Jennifer Tilly, earlier on while flipping through her social media feed. She breaks in and is caught by Michelle. Tiffany attempts to convince her that she needs the Wedding Belle doll because the Good Guys she donated for the charity event last year never made it to the intended hospitals. Before Michelle gets the doll, Chucky lunges from behind and slices Michelle in half. Tiffany calls him despicable for killing a mother on Christmas Eve, and asks what Jake, Devon and Lexy are going to do now without any guardians. Chucky retorts that children who misbehave have to be punished, and demands to know where Glen and Glenda are. Tiffany refuses to let him hurt any of them, telling him that he has to go through her first. Before Chucky makes his move, Lexy jumps on top of him and grabs his chainsaw. As Lexy kills him, Tiffany walks past her and upstairs to Caroline's room to take the Wedding Belle doll. Unbeknownst to her, Jake and Devon are waiting, and each take a stab at Tiffany. As she is backed into the end of the hallway, Caroline emerges from one of the rooms. Chucky was able to brainwash her with his lies, convincing her that Tiffany is her real mother. She gives Tiffany a knife and allows herself to be held hostage, ensuring Tiffany leaves with the doll.

Three weeks later, Tiffany has taken Caroline with her to Times Square. In order to avoid suspicion, as Jennifer Tilly is still wanted for murder, she dyes her hair black and dresses in a more gothic fashion. One night, she receives a call from Nica, who explains that she is still coming to torture and kill her, and discloses that she is staying in a hotel opposite to her. Realizing she is out of time, Tiffany proceeds with the ritual to possess the Wedding Belle doll, but for some reason it does not work. As the doll rises up on its own, it begins removing its contact lenses and wig to reveal that it was Chucky all along. He proceeds to advance on Tiffany with a knife as she screams.

Other appearances
On the special features of the Seed of Chucky DVD, Tiffany sits alongside Chucky and Glen on a sofa in their family home, where they watch a slideshow of their holiday to various places. Nearly all of these places have evidence of Chucky having killed someone; this upsets Tiffany and makes Glen feel uncomfortable. Also on the special features of Seed of Chucky DVD, Chucky and Tiffany are interviewed by the Fuzion interviewer to promote the film.

References

Child's Play (franchise) characters
Female horror film villains
Female villains
Fictional bisexual females
Fictional characters from New Jersey
Fictional characters from New York (state)
Fictional characters who use magic
Fictional characters with spirit possession or body swapping abilities
Fictional dolls and dummies
Fictional female murderers
Fictional LGBT characters in television
Fictional monsters
Fictional murdered people
Fictional puppets
Fictional serial killers
Fictional witches
Film characters introduced in 1998
Film supervillains
LGBT villains
Female film villains
Undead supervillains